Huawei Ascend G330 is a budget smartphone made by Huawei. It went on sale in October 2012.

It runs the Android 4.0.4  operating system.  It has a 1 GHz dual core processor with 4GB internal storage with 2.5GB available for the user and 512MB of internal memory (RAM). The phone also has a 4.0 inch display and a 5.0MP rear camera.

References

Android (operating system) devices
G300
Mobile phones introduced in 2012
Discontinued smartphones